A Stitch in Time is a 1963 Norman Wisdom comedy film set in a children's hospital.  It was directed by Robert Asher and edited by Gerry Hambling.  The cast includes Edward Chapman, Jeanette Sterke, Jerry Desmonde, Jill Melford, Glyn Houston, Vera Day, Patsy Rowlands, Peter Jones, Ernest Clark, Hazel Hughes, Lucy Appleby and Frank Williams. The film also features an early role for Johnny Briggs.

Plot
Norman Pitkin is an apprentice to Mr Grimsdale, an old fashioned butcher. When the shop is raided by a young thug (Johnny Briggs), Mr Grimsdale (at Norman's suggestion), puts his gold watch in his mouth for safe-keeping. This results in Mr Grimsdale accidentally swallowing the watch and being sent to hospital. Whilst visiting Mr Grimsdale, Norman (in his usual way) inadvertently causes chaos all over the hospital. He meets a girl called Lindy who hasn't spoken since her parents died in an aeroplane accident. Banned from the hospital, Norman is unable to visit Lindy so he and Mr Grimsdale join the St John Ambulance Brigade which gives him the opportunity to visit her. The usual pandemonium ensues. In the end Lindy visits him at a charity ball where the St John Ambulance Brigade Band are performing. The ball descends into the inevitable shambles, caused entirely by Norman. However, Norman redeems himself (and the reputation of the Brigade) whose ambulance drove of all by itself, when he addresses those attending the ball and everyone donates money for the charity.  The next day Norman  dreamed he's back in hospital.

Cast
Norman Wisdom as Norman Pitkin
Edward Chapman as Mr Grimsdale
Jeanette Sterke as Nurse Haskell
Jerry Desmonde as Sir Hector
Jill Melford as Lady Brinkley
Glyn Houston as Cpl Welsh of the St John Ambulance Brigade
Hazel Hughes as Matron
Patsy Rowlands as Amy
Peter Jones as Divisional Officer Russell of the St John Ambulance Brigade
Ernest Clark as Prof. Crankshaw
Lucy Appleby as Lindy
Vera Day as Betty
Frank Williams as Driver Nuttall of the St John Ambulance Brigade
Penny Morrell as Nurse Rudkin
Patrick Cargill as Dr Meadows
Francis Matthews as Benson
John Blythe as Dale, Press Photographer
Pamela Conway as Patient
Danny Green as Ticehurst
Johnny Briggs as Armed Robber
Michael Goodliffe as Doctor on the Children's Ward (uncredited)
Tony Thawnton as St John Ambulance Driver in last few minutes of movie (uncredited)
Pat Coombs as Nurse (uncredited)
 Paul Grist as Medical Student (uncredited)

Filming
The film was shot almost entirely at Pinewood Studios in Buckinghamshire.  Location filming was kept to a minimum.

Release
A Stitch in Time represents Wisdom's most commercially successful title. It was among the ten most popular films of the year at the British box office in 1964.

The film was rereleased in 1984 in Chennai India. The film was a smash hit and ran for many weeks at the old Alankar Theatre (now demolished).

Critical reception
The  Radio Times gave the film two out of five stars: "this was (Wisdom's) final film in black and white and also his last big starring success at the box office, for he belonged to a more innocent age. The script sticks closely to the winning Wisdom formula as he knots his cap in confused shyness in his attempts to declare his love for a pretty nurse. Stalwart stooges Edward Chapman (Mr Grimsdale, of course) and Jerry Desmonde prove once more that straight men can often be much funnier than the comics".
Sky Movies gave the film three out of five stars, noting the film "has just enough inspired tomfoolery - a madcap race on casualty trolleys down the corridors of a hospital; a hectic ride for a bandaged Norman on top of an ambulance; Norman messing up a St John's Ambulance Brigade concert - to ensure a decent quota of laughs. In his silly stunts, he is forever the naughty boy having the time of his life doing what he shouldn't".
TV Guide gave the film three out of five stars, and noted, "a charming and sentimental piece of characterization from Wisdom."

External links

References

1963 films
British comedy films
1963 comedy films
Films directed by Robert Asher
Films shot at Pinewood Studios
1960s English-language films
1960s British films